Šedá or Seda is a Czech-language surname. It may refer to:
 César Seda (1986), Puerto Rican professional boxer
 Dori Seda (1951–1988), American female comics artist
 Frans Seda (1977), Indonesian finance minister
 Jan Šeda (1985), Czech football player
 Jon Seda (1970), American actor
 Kateřina Šedá (1977), Czech artist
 Luís Seda (1976), Puerto Rican boxer
 Michal Šeda (1982), Czech former professional ice hockey defenceman
 Santos Seda, Puerto Rican politician

Czech-language surnames
Surnames from nicknames